Tan Sri Haji Ismail bin Haji Omar (born 17 May 1953) is a retired Malaysian police officer who served as the ninth Inspector-General of Police of Malaysia succeeding Tan Sri Musa Hassan and was succeeded by Khalid Abu Bakar. On 13 September 2013 he was appointed the Ambassador of Malaysia to France by Yang di-Pertuan Agong Abdul Halim Mu'adzam Shah.

Educational background 

He holds a law degree from International Islamic University Malaysia, he then furthered his studies at the Kuala Kubu Bahru Police College. In 1971, he was commissioned as the Probationary Inspector.

Career 

Ismail was a Criminal Investigation Officer at the Seremban District Police Headquarters in 1972 and Kuala Pilah District Police Headquarters in 1975 before he was posted to Ipoh District Police Headquarters in 1977 as a Traffic Investigation Officer, and was posted to Kerian District Police Headquarters in 1978 as a Criminal Investigation Officer. In 1980, he served as Officer in Charge of Taiping Training Area Training Center.

In 1983, he was promoted to Assistant Superintendent of Police and posted to the Federal Police Headquarters as one of the officers-in-charge in disciplinary investigations. He was made prosecuting officer in Ipoh in 1994 before being promoted as Seberang Perai Tengah District Police Chief in 1996.

In 1999, he was promoted to rank of Assistant Commissioner of Police and was made head of the CID Legal and Prosecution Affairs in Bukit Aman. He then moved up the rank and was made Assistant CID Director in 2004 with the rank of Senior Assistant Commissioner of Police II.

He was promoted to deputy director of Narcotics Crime Investigation Department in 2005 with the rank of Senior Assistant Commissioner of Police I. In 2005, he was promoted to Deputy Commissioner of Police and was assume the role of Selangor Police Chief.

Later, he was promoted and made director of Management Department with the rank of Commissioner of Police. Hardly a year later, he was appointed as Deputy Inspector General of Police.

On 13 September 2010, the monarch appointed him as the Malaysian IGP.

After Retirement
Ismail was appointed as Malaysia's Ambassador to France in 2013-2015. He later joined NSTP Berhad as chairman in 2017.

Honours

Honours of Malaysia
  :
 Commander of the Order of Loyalty to the Crown of Malaysia (P.S.M.) - Tan Sri (2008)
 Commander of the Order of the Defender of the Realm (P.M.N.) - Tan Sri (2011)
  :
 Knight Companion of the Order of Loyalty to the Royal House of Kedah (D.S.D.K.) - Dato’ (2006)
 Knight Grand Companion of the Order of Loyalty to the Royal House of Kedah (S.S.D.K.) - Dato’ Seri (2008)
 :
 Grand Knight of the Order of Sultan Ahmad Shah of Pahang (S.S.A.P.) - Dato’ Sri (2008)
 :
 Knight Grand Commander of the Order of the Loyalty to the Crown of Kelantan (S.P.S.K.) - Dato’ (2009)
 :
 Knight Grand Commander of the Order of the Crown of Selangor (S.P.M.S.) - Dato’ Seri (2010)
 :
 Knight Grand Commander of the Order of Taming Sari (S.P.T.S.) - Dato’ Seri Panglima (2010)
 :
 Knight Commander of the Order of the Defender of State (D.P.P.N.) - Dato’ Seri (2011)
 :
 Knight Grand Commander of the Order of the Crown of Perlis (S.P.M.P.) - Dato’ Seri (2012)
 :
 Knight Commander of the Exalted Order of Malacca (D.C.S.M.) - Datuk Wira (2012)
 :
 Grand Knight of the Order of the Territorial Crown (S.U.M.W.) - Datuk Seri Utama (2012) (scheduled conferred in 2012 but Ismail Omar was on a working trip to foreign country so the honour was officially conferred in 2013)
  :
 Knight Grand Commander of the Order of the Crown of Terengganu (S.P.M.T.) - Dato’ (2013)
  :
 Grand Commander of the Order of Kinabalu (S.P.D.K) - Datuk Seri Panglima (2013)

References

External links 
 Royal Malaysian Police 

1953 births
Malaysian police chiefs
Malaysian police officers
Living people
People from Kedah
Malaysian people of Malay descent
Malaysian Muslims
International Islamic University Malaysia alumni
Ambassadors of Malaysia to France
Grand Commanders of the Order of Kinabalu
Malaysian expatriates in France
Commanders of the Order of Loyalty to the Crown of Malaysia
Commanders of the Order of the Defender of the Realm
Knights Grand Commander of the Order of the Crown of Selangor
Knights Grand Commander of the Order of the Crown of Terengganu